Euclidia dentata is a moth of the family Erebidae. It is found in Russia (Siberia, Altai, Ussuri, Amur, Primorje), China and Korea.

References

Moths described in 1892
Euclidia